Stefan Pittl (born June 2, 1984) is an Austrian professional ice hockey defenceman currently playing EHC Kundl in the lower Austrian league. He joined Kundl after six seasons for HC TWK Innsbruck of the Erste Bank Hockey League.

Pittl began his career with Innsbruck for three seasons before moving to EC Red Bull Salzburg in 2004.  He won the Austrian Championship in 2007 with Salzburg.  He signed for Graz 99ers in 2007.  In 2009 he returned to Innsbruck for a second spell.

External links
 

1984 births
Austrian ice hockey defencemen
Graz 99ers players
HC TWK Innsbruck players
Living people
EC Red Bull Salzburg players